The Castoldi was a French automobile manufacturer in Lyon around 1900.  The company was founded as a bicycle builder, but also produced a handful of motorcycles and voiturettes.

References
David Burgess Wise, The New Illustrated Encyclopedia of Automobiles.

Defunct motor vehicle manufacturers of France
Manufacturing companies based in Lyon